Techno-Cracked is a 1933 Celebrity Productions, Inc. animated short,  directed by Ub Iwerks and featuring Flip the Frog.

Synopsis
In this satire of the Technocracy, Flip the Frog is nearly killed by a menacing robot he builds to work for him.

Flip would rather not mow the lawn. He reads an article from "Unpopular Mechanics" entitled "Technocracy: Why be a Slave - The Mechanical Man Works While You Sleep". Flip makes his robot out of household parts but gives it a Jack-o'-lantern for a head. The mechanical man cannot follow directions and begins mowing down everything in sight. Flip blows up the robot with a stick of dynamite and finishes the lawn by himself.

Notes and comments
When the robot mows the welcome mat it reveals the word Nerts, a possible reference to either the card game or to a popular expression of the time -- "nertz". Some have speculated that Techno-Cracked may have been photographed in two-strip Technicolor.

References

External links
Techno-Cracked at the Big Cartoon Database

1933 films
1933 animated films
Films directed by Ub Iwerks
American science fiction comedy films
1930s science fiction films
American robot films
Films about frogs
Films scored by Carl Stalling
Metro-Goldwyn-Mayer animated short films
1930s American films